ZMD: Zombies of Mass Destruction is a six-issue comic book limited series published by Red 5 Comics and created by American comic book writer/creator Kevin Grevioux who wrote the original screenplay for the movie Underworld, and co-created the Underworld franchise.

Plot
The story revolves around a government weapons program that drops photosensitive zombies into war zones at night to destroy the enemy population. When one of these zombies somehow escapes in the Middle East, a team of elite soldiers must enter hostile territory to stop a growing zombie army.

Film
As of July 2008, the property has been optioned for a film by the management/production company Benderspink. In early 2009 it was announced that Dirk Blackman and Howard McCain had been hired to work on the script.

Notes

References

2008 comics debuts